Glanfield is a surname. Notable people with the surname include:

Jonathan Glanfield (born 1979), English sailor
Richard Glanfield (born 1964), English squash player and coach